David Russell Wagoner (June 5, 1926 – December 18, 2021) was an American poet, novelist, and educator.

Biography
David Russell Wagoner was born on June 5, 1926, in Massillon, Ohio. Raised in Whiting, Indiana, from the age of seven, Wagoner attended Pennsylvania State University where he was a member of Naval ROTC and graduated in three years. He received an M.A. in English from the Indiana University in 1949 and had a long association with the University of Washington where he taught, beginning in 1954, on the suggestion of friend and fellow poet Theodore Roethke.

Wagoner was editor of Poetry Northwest from 1966 to 2002. He was elected chancellor of the Academy of American Poets in 1978 and served in that capacity until 1999. One of his novels, The Escape Artist, was turned into a film by executive producer Francis Ford Coppola. 

Wagoner was Professor Emeritus at the University of Washington, but after his retirement from full-time university teaching, Wagoner continued to lecture and teach in various workshop and low-residency writing programs, including the Hugo House and the MFA program of the Northwest Institute of Literary Arts on Whidbey Island.

Poetry and recognition
The natural environment of the Pacific Northwest was the subject of much of David Wagoner's poetry. He cited his move from the Midwest as a defining moment: "[W]hen I came over the Cascades and down into the coastal rainforest for the first time in the fall of 1954, it was a big event for me, it was a real crossing of a threshold, a real change of consciousness. Nothing was ever the same again."

David Wagoner's Collected Poems was nominated for the National Book Award in 1977 and he won the Pushcart Prize that same year. He was again nominated for a National Book Award in 1979 for In Broken Country. He won his second Pushcart Prize in 1983. He is the recipient of the American Academy of Arts and Letters award, the Sherwood Anderson Foundation Fiction Award, the Ruth Lilly Poetry Prize (1991), the English-Speaking Union prize from Poetry magazine, and the Arthur Rense Prize in 2011. He has also received fellowships from the Ford Foundation, the Guggenheim Foundation, and the National Endowment for the Arts.

Death
Wagoner died in his sleep at a nursing home in Edmonds, Washington, on December 18, 2021, at the age of 95. He was survived by his wife, Robin Seyfried, and their two daughters.

Bibliography

Poetry collections

Novels
 The Man in the Middle (1954)
 Money, Money, Money (1955)
 Rock (1958)
 The Escape Artist (1965)
 Baby, Come On Inside (1968)
 Where is My Wandering Boy Tonight? (1970)
 The Road to Many a Wonder (1974)
 Tracker (1975)
 Whole Hog (1976)
 The Hanging Garden (1980)

Edited volumes
 Straw for the Fire: From the Notebooks of Theodore Roethke (1972) (selected and arranged by David Wagoner)
 The Best American Poetry 2009

Theatre
 An Eye For An Eye For An Eye (produced in 1973) 
 First Class: A Play About Theodore Roethke (2007).

References

Further reading
   (print and on-line)

External links
 Biography at HistoryLink
 David Wagoner at Poets.org
 David Wagoner (1926 – 2021), Poetry Foundation
 David Wagoner poem  ''In Distress"
 David Wagoner Sound, Rhythm and Meaning: A Pacific Northwest Chapbook Curated by David Wagoner

1926 births
2021 deaths
20th-century American male writers
20th-century American novelists
20th-century American poets
21st-century American male writers
21st-century American poets
American male novelists
American male poets
Indiana University alumni
National Endowment for the Arts Fellows
The New Yorker people
Novelists from Ohio
Novelists from Washington (state)
Pennsylvania State University alumni
People from Massillon, Ohio
People from Whiting, Indiana
Poets from Ohio
University of Washington faculty